Loughborough Students Rugby Union Football Club represents Loughborough University in rugby union competition. Of the British universities, Loughborough has unparalleled success, having won the BUCS championship (in its former guises as the BUSA and UAU championship) on twenty-seven occasions. It fields sides in the BUCS league, (inter-university) and in the fourth tier of the English rugby union system, National League 2 West. The club has fielded over seventy internationals (male and female), many of whom won caps while playing for the club.

History

Loughborough Colleges
The history of the club predates the formation of Loughborough University. The students of Loughborough College formed what is considered the original side in September 1919. Loughborough began competing in the Universities Athletic Union (UAU) in the 1930–31, and the Loughborough Colleges XV beat Nottingham University 8 – 0 in their first match. It was not until 1939 that the Loughborough Colleges reached the UAU final for the first time. They lost in a closely fought match to Swansea, whose win was the sixth in seven seasons.

It was in the post-Second World War period that Loughborough's reputation began to be made. Two future captains of England, Eric Evans and Jeff Butterfield played for the club in this period, as did Ray Williams, who eventually became Secretary of the Welsh Rugby Union. It was no surprise when, in 1953, Loughborough Colleges finally won the UAU for the first time. The club became one of the Midlands leading clubs and in 1959 they won the Middlesex Sevens.

In the sixties an already impressive fixture list was enhanced by John Robins, the coach from 1962. It included Leicester, Gloucester, Rosslyn Park, Moseley and London Irish. John Robins went on to become the first British Lions coach. During his tenure at Loughborough, the UAU was won from 1962 to 1968 with only 1965 eluding the club. John Robins left Loughborough in 1967, and was replaced by the Scotland and Lions international Jim Greenwood. In 1970 Greenwood coached the Colleges to victory in the Middlesex Sevens, and in the first Twickenham UAU final, the Colleges beat Nottingham University 22 – 3. The 1970–71 side included six future internationals, Lewis Dick, David Cooke, Clive Rees, Fran Cotton, Steve Smith, and Dick Cowman. While at Loughborough, Jim Greenwood's pivotal coaching books, "Total Rugby" and "Think Rugby", were penned.

Loughborough University is formed
In 1976, the Students' Unions of the University of Technology and the Loughborough Colleges merged and the Loughborough Students Rugby Club was formed. The first Chairman of the new club was Tony Field. The team won the Middlesex 7s for the first and only time as Loughborough Students, Loughborough Colleges having won it four times previously. The team won the UAU in 1977, 1978 and 1979, with the 1978–79 side captained by the young centre Clive Woodward.

Rex Hazeldine, later England's first fitness coach, replaced Greenwood and is credited with being an integral part of the revolution of attitudes to the game at international level. In 1984 the UAU was won once again, as was the Leicestershire Cup. A touring Australian Universities side was also defeated. In the 1985–86 season a team led by Andy Robinson won through to the third round of the John Player Cup, going out to London Wasps. The same team won the UAU Championships.

Joining the RFU League
At the inception of the RFU League, the team was offered a place in National 2. They turned this down and in 1996, when the Students did apply to join they had to join at the bottom of the league system. It was soon apparent that the standard of rugby at the university had been left behind by the professional teams in the league and in 1998 a full-time Director of Rugby, Ian "Dosser" Smith, was appointed. Alan Buzza took over from Smith in 2001 and is credited with modernizing the club. League promotions in 2001–02 and 2002–03 engendered confidence and the club was further enhanced by the presence of a number of excellent players including Tom Evans Jones, Edward Binham, Justin Abrahams, Andy Vilk, Peter Janes, James Jones, Sam Ulph and captain Charlie Cooper. As far as a British Universities championship win was concerned, however, the drought continued until, under the coach Paul Westgate, back to back wins were achieved in 2005 and 2006. Dave Morris took over as head coach from Westgate and immediately gained League promotion in 2007 to Midlands 1. The next season promotion was achieved to National League 2 North making the team the first student side to take part in the National Leagues. They finished in sixth place and in the same season achieved a win over England under-20s.

Current standings

Honours
Melrose Sevens winners (2): 1968, 1969
Middlesex Sevens winners (5): 1959, 1964, 1966, 1970, 1976
Glengarth Sevens Main Event winners (2): 1968, 1970
Gala Sevens winners (1): 1965
Leicestershire County Cup winners (7): 1977–78, 1983–84, 1984–85, 1990–91, 1993–94, 1998–99, 2005–06
East Midlands/Leicestershire 4 champions: 1995–96
Leicestershire 1 champions: 1996–97
Midlands 4 East (North) champions: 2001–02 
Midlands 3 East (north v south) promotion play-off winner: 2002–03
Midlands Division 2 East champions: 2006–07
Midlands Division 1 champions: 2007–08
National League 2 South champions: 2011–12

Former players

Men

British and Irish Lions

 Jeff Butterfield
 Fran Cotton
 Gerald Davies
 John Dawes
 Tony Diprose
 Gareth Griffiths
 Ben Kay
 Colin McFadyean
 Eric Miller
 Alun Pask
 Clive Rees
 Bev Risman)
 John Robins
 Keith Savage
 Ollie Smith
 John Taylor
 Clive Woodward

England

 Tom Brophy
 Phil Burgess (Sevens)
 Jeff Butterfield
 Phil Christophers
 David Cooke
 Fran Cotton
 Dick Cowman
 Tony Diprose
 Dave Egerton
 Ayoola Erinle
 Eric Evans
 Keith Fielding
 Mike Gavins
 David Hazel
 Dan Hipkiss
 Roger Hosen
 Ben Kay
 Colin McFadyean
 Mark Mapletoft
 John Pallant
 Derek Prout
 Bev Risman
 Andy Robinson
 Dave Rollitt
 Bob Rowell
 Keith Savage
 Ollie Smith
 Steve Smith
 Phil Taylor
 Andy Vilk (Sevens)
 Bryan West
 Lionel Weston
 Brian Whightman
 Roy Winters
 Clive Woodward
 Will Edwards (Sevens)
 Freddie Steward
 Dan Kelly

Ireland

 Ken Armstrong
 Jonny Bell
 Mark Bruce (Sevens)
 Paul Burke
 Niall Malone
 Eric Miller

Scotland

 Adam Buchanan-Smith
 Henry Pyrgos
 Jim Davidson
 Lewis Dick
 Andy Macdonald
 Robert MacEwen
 Alex Allan (rugby union)
 Eric Peters

Wales

 Gerald Davies
 Rhodri Davies (Sevens)
 John Dawes
 Gareth Griffiths
 Will Harries (Sevens)
 Dai Haywood
 Leighton Jenkins
 Derwyn Jones
 Ken Jones
 John Mantle
 Alun Pask
 John Robins
 John Taylor
 Clive Rees

Other countries

 Thibaud Flament – 
 Ashley Billington – 
 Mark Wright – 
 Ed Rolston – 
 Pete Williams – 
 Iain Mc Mullan – 
 Bill Hayward – 
 Alex Almeida –

Women

England

 Nicky Ponsford
 Sam Robson
 Karen Almond
 Val Moore
 Pip Atkinson
 Emma Mitchell
 Charlotte Barras
 Lois Moulding
 Kim Shaylor
 Katie Mullen
 Sally Cockerill
 Sarah Hunter (Captain)
 Olivia Poore
 Vicky McQeen
 Roz Jermaine (nee Crowley)
 Vicky Jackson
 Sophie Nicholas (Sevens)
 Claire Allen
 Becky Essex

Ireland
 Jo O'Sullivan
 Judith Wilson
 Joy Sparkes

Wales
 Liza Burgess
 Amanda Bennett
 Belinda Trotter
 Jenna Studley
 Laura Prosser
 Louise Rickard

Scotland
 Lyndsey Douglas

References

External links
 Loughborough Students Sports (Rugby section)

English rugby union teams
Rugby
Rugby clubs established in 1919
Rugby union clubs in Leicestershire
University and college rugby union clubs in England